Robert Wood Young (born September 3, 1947) is an American broadcast journalist, author, and politician who served as Mayor of Augusta, Georgia. Young also served a presidential appointment by George W. Bush on the Advisory Council on Historic Preservation and at United States Department of Housing and Urban Development. Young later served as the President and chief executive officer (CEO) of the Southeastern Natural Sciences Academy. He is currently owner and CEO of Eagle Veterans Services LLC and Squeaky Productions, both headquartered in Augusta.

Early life
Young was born September 3, 1947, in Pasadena, California and grew up in Thomson, Georgia. He is an alumnus of Wofford College and the Augusta State University. Young is married to Gwen Fulcher Young of Augusta.

Young is a descendant of Brigham Young through his great-great-great grandmother, Lucy Decker Young

Career

Journalism 
During Young 26-year-career in broadcast journalism, he produced two award-winning documentaries: The Great March about William Tecumseh Sherman's Civil War invasion of Georgia, and Ike's Augusta, a chronicle of Dwight Eisenhower's membership at the Augusta National Golf Club.

Government service 
Young served in the United States Air Force during the Vietnam War and served as a broadcast specialist in the Armed Forces Vietnam Network as part of the Military Assistance Command Vietnam. In 1999, he became mayor of Augusta, Georgia, serving until 2005. On June 20, 2005. Young accepted a presidential appointment by George W. Bush to serve as Director of the United States Department of Housing and Urban Development for the Atlanta Region. On June 13, 2007, Young was further designated Assistant Deputy Secretary for Field Policy and Management, a position overseeing HUD Regional Directors for ten regions across the nation. Previously, he was appointed to represent the nation's mayors on the Advisory Council on Historic Preservation.

Writing career 
In 2009, Young began writing what would become his first novel, The Treasure Train; a historical novel set in Augusta around the end of the Civil War. The book follows the account of the midnight raid at Chennault, Georgia, and the stolen shipment of confederate gold; delving into the derivative tales and folklore it spawned. Young credited Dr. Mark Waters for giving him the historical basis in fact for the storyline his fiction would closely follow. In 2017 Young published his second historical novel The Hand of the Wicked, based on the events surrounding the murder of freed woman Nellie West during Georgia Reconstruction.

References

External links
Bob Young's The Treasure Train

1948 births
Living people
Mayors of Augusta, Georgia
Novelists from Georgia (U.S. state)
American male novelists
People from Thomson, Georgia
American Latter Day Saints
United States Air Force personnel of the Vietnam War
United States Air Force airmen
American chief executives
Richards–Young family
21st-century American novelists
21st-century American male writers